Libel is a 1959 British drama film starring Olivia de Havilland, Dirk Bogarde, Paul Massie, Wilfrid Hyde-White and Robert Morley. The film's screenplay was written by Anatole de Grunwald and Karl Tunberg from a 1935 play of the same name by Edward Wooll.

The film's location shots include Longleat House, Wiltshire (fictionalised as Ingworth House) and London.

Plot
While travelling in London, Canadian World War II veteran pilot Jeffrey Buckenham sees baronet Sir Mark Sebastian Loddon on television leading a tour of his ancestral home in England. Buckenham recalls that he was held in a POW camp in Germany with Loddon, whom the Germans captured during the Dunkirk evacuation of 1940. Buckenham is convinced that Loddon is Frank Wellney, a British actor. Wellney and Loddon shared a POW hut in 1945 and bore a striking resemblance to each other.

Buckenham confronts Loddon and, with encouragement from Loddon's scheming cousin Gerald Loddon, writes to a tabloid newspaper, claiming that Wellney is posing as Loddon. In response, Loddon sues Buckenham and the newspaper for libel, although his memory is affected by his wartime trauma.

During the libel trial, Buckenham and Loddon tell their versions of wartime imprisonment and their escape. Buckenham had liked Loddon and despised Wellney. In spring 1945, the three prisoners escaped their POW camp and headed toward the Dutch border, seeking advancing Allied forces. Loddon wore his British army uniform and Wellney disguised himself in civilian clothes. One night, having gone without food for days, Buckenham left Loddon and Wellney alone to steal food from a farm. As Buckenham returned, he heard shots. In the mist, he witnessed one man in a British uniform lying on the ground, apparently dead, and another fleeing in civilian clothes. Buckenham believed that he had witnessed Wellney fleeing the scene of Loddon's murder.

During the trial, Lodden is found to be missing part of his right index finger, as had Wellney, and Loddon claims it to be the result of gunfire. Loddon also does not appear to have a childhood scar on his leg. Wellney's hair was prematurely grey, as is Loddon's. Buckenham recounts how Wellney often asked Loddon about his personal life during their imprisonment, and Loddon even joked that Wellney could be mistaken for him. As evidence mounts, even Loddon's loyal wife Margaret begins to doubt her husband's identity.

Defence barrister Hubert Foxley produces a courtroom surprise, revealing that the uniformed man that Buckenham had seen did not die. Although the man is alive, his face is horribly disfigured, his right arm has been amputated and he has become deranged. He has been living in a German asylum since the war, known simply as "Number Fifteen," his bed number. When Foxley brings the man into the courtroom, the man and Loddon recognise each other and Loddon's memory starts to return.

In desperation, Loddon's barrister calls Margaret to the stand, but she testifies that she now believes her husband to be Wellney, the impostor, implying that "Number Fifteen" is the real Loddon. Later, Margaret confronts her husband, who desperately walks the night trying to remember more. Seeing his reflection in a canal unlocks his memories. Wellney did try to kill him while his back was turned, but Loddon saw Wellney's reflection in the water and won their ensuing fight. He remembers beating Wellney harshly with a farm tool before switching their clothes and fleeing.

In court, Loddon remembers a medallion hidden in his jacket lining that Margaret had given him in 1939 before he left for France. By proving that the medallion had been in Wellney's possession all the time, Loddon wins the libel case and Margaret realizes that her husband is whom she had thought that he was. Buckenham and Loddon also reconcile, although Buckenham and the newspaper must pay damages.

Cast
 Dirk Bogarde as Sir Mark Loddon/Frank Wellney/Number Fifteen
 Olivia de Havilland as Lady Margaret Loddon
 Paul Massie as Jeffrey Buckenham
 Robert Morley as Sir Wilfred
 Wilfrid Hyde White as Hubert Foxley
 Anthony Dawson as Gerald Lodden
 Richard Wattis as The Judge
 Martin Miller as Dr. Schrott 
 Richard Dimbleby as Himself
 Millicent Martin as Maisie
 Robert Shaw and Geoffrey Bayldon in small roles as photographers
 Sam Kydd as Newspaper vendor (uncredited)
 Oliver Reed as an extra in courtroom visitors' gallery (uncredited)

Box office
According to MGM records, the film earned $245,000 in the U.S. and Canada and $925,000 in other markets, resulting in a profit of $10,000.

Awards and honours
The film was nominated for the Academy Award for Best Sound (A. W. Watkins).

The film was nominated by the American Film Institute for inclusion in its 10 Top 10 list in the category of courtroom drama.

Adaptations 
The Broadway play, which had starred Colin Clive, was adapted for radio in 1941 and 1943 using the original references to World War. Ronald Colman played the leading role in a one-hour 13 January 1941 CBS Lux Radio Theatre broadcast with Otto Kruger and Frances Robinson. On 15 March 1943, Colman and Kruger reprised their roles for a second Lux Radio Theatre broadcast. The role of an amnesiac World War I veteran had similarities to Colman's part in the 1942 hit Random Harvest.

A 1938 BBC television production featured actor Wyndham Goldie.

References

External links
 
 
 
 

1959 films
1959 drama films
British black-and-white films
British drama films
British courtroom films
Films about amnesia
British films based on plays
Films directed by Anthony Asquith
Films scored by Benjamin Frankel
Metro-Goldwyn-Mayer films
Films with screenplays by Anatole de Grunwald
World War II prisoner of war films
Films produced by Anatole de Grunwald
Films shot at MGM-British Studios
1950s English-language films
1950s British films